Metro Atlanta, designated by the United States Office of Management and Budget as the Atlanta–Sandy Springs–Alpharetta, GA Metropolitan Statistical Area, is the most populous metropolitan statistical area in the U.S. state of Georgia and the eighth-largest in the United States. Its economic, cultural, and demographic center is Atlanta, and its total population was 6,144,050 in the 2021 estimate from the U.S. Census Bureau. 

The metro area forms the core of a broader trading area, the Atlanta–Athens-Clarke–Sandy Springs Combined Statistical Area. The Combined Statistical Area spans up to 39 counties in north Georgia, and one county in Alabama, Chambers. The Combined Statistical Area recorded in the 2020 U.S. census a population of 6,930,423. Atlanta is the second-largest metropolitan area in the Census Bureau's Southeast region, behind that of Greater Washington, D.C. It surpassed the Greater Miami area in total population in 2021.

Definitions

By U.S. Census Bureau standards, the population of the Atlanta region spreads across a metropolitan area of  – a land area comparable to that of Massachusetts. Because Georgia contains more counties than any other state except Texas (explained in part by the now-defunct county-unit system of weighing votes in primary elections), area residents live under a heavily decentralized collection of governments. As of the 2000 census, fewer than one in ten residents of the metropolitan area lived inside Atlanta city limits.

A 2006 survey by the Metro Atlanta Chamber of Commerce counted 140 cities and towns in the 28‑county Metropolitan Statistical Area (MSA) in mid-2005. Nine cities – Johns Creek (2006), Milton (2006), Chattahoochee Hills (2007), Dunwoody (2008), Peachtree Corners (2012), Brookhaven (2012), Tucker (2016), Stonecrest (2016) and South Fulton (2017) – have incorporated since then, following the lead of Sandy Springs in 2005.

The Atlanta metropolitan area was first defined in 1950 as Fulton, DeKalb, Gwinnett, Cobb and Clayton counties. Walton, Newton, Douglas, Fayette, Forsyth, Henry, Cherokee, Rockdale, and Butts counties were added after the 1970 census, with Barrow and Coweta counties joining in 1980 and Bartow, Carroll, Paulding, Pickens and Spalding counties in 1990.

Atlanta's larger combined statistical area (CSA) adds the Gainesville and Athens metropolitan areas plus LaGrange, Thomaston, Jefferson, Calhoun, and Cedartown micropolitan areas, for a total 2012 population of 6,162,195. The CSA also abuts the Macon and Columbus MSAs. The region is one of the metropolises of the Southeastern United States, and is part of the emerging megalopolis known as Piedmont Atlantic Megaregion along the I-85 Corridor.

In 2019, the name of the MSA was changed from Atlanta–Sandy Springs–Roswell to Atlanta–Sandy Springs–Alpharetta.

Metropolitan statistical area

The counties listed below are included in the Atlanta–Sandy Springs–Alpharetta, GA Metropolitan Statistical Area. However, some entities define a much smaller metropolitan area by including only the counties which have the densest suburban development. Fulton, DeKalb, Gwinnett, Cobb, and Clayton were the five original counties when the Atlanta metropolitan area was first defined in 1950, and continue to be the core of the metro area. These five counties along with six more (Cherokee, Douglas, Fayette, Henry, Rockdale, and Forsyth) are members of the Atlanta Regional Commission, a weak metropolitan government organization which also is a regional planning agency. The eleven ARC counties, bolded, and four more (Bartow, Coweta, Hall, Paulding), with an asterisk (*), form part of the Metropolitan North Georgia Water Planning District, created in 2001.

Atlanta–Sandy Springs–Alpharetta, GA Metropolitan Statistical Area

The 12 counties listed above with under 85,000 residents are usually not included in any other metropolitan definition except the OMB/Census Bureau's MSA and CSA.

Hall County forms the Gainesville MSA, but with astronomical growth to over 200,000 residents, is now also part of the Atlanta CSA.

The official tourism website of the State of Georgia features a "Metro Atlanta" tourism region that includes only eight counties: Fulton, DeKalb, Gwinnett, Cobb, Clayton, Douglas, Fayette, and Henry.

Combined statistical area

Atlanta GA-AL Combined Statistical Area

Municipalities

Edge cities 
 Cumberland
 Perimeter Center
 Hartsfield-Jackson area
 Gwinnett Place/Sugarloaf area
More than one half of metro Atlanta's population is in unincorporated areas or areas considered a census-designated-place (CDP) by the census bureau. One notable example is East Cobb, an unincorporated area (though not a CDP) adjacent to Marietta and Roswell in Cobb County. With an estimated population of approximately 208,000 as of 2019, it would be the second largest city in the metro besides Atlanta if incorporated.

Metro Atlanta includes the following incorporated and unincorporated suburbs (both inside and outside Atlanta), exurbs, and surrounding cities, sorted by population according to 2010 census data (or later data if the city was incorporated after 2010 and census data is unavailable):

Cities and suburbs 
Principal city
 Atlanta pop. 498,044

Places with 75,000 to 99,999 inhabitants
 South Fulton (incorporated 2017) pop. 95,158
 Sandy Springs pop. 93,853
 Roswell pop. 88,346
 Johns Creek pop. 76,728

Places with 50,000 to 74,999 inhabitants
 Alpharetta pop. 57,551
 Marietta pop. 56,579
 Stonecrest (incorporated 2016) pop. 53,490
 Smyrna pop. 51,271

Places with 25,000 to 49,999 inhabitants

 Dunwoody pop. 46,267
 Peachtree Corners (incorporated 2012) pop. 43,905
 Brookhaven (incorporated 2012) pop. 40,456
 Mableton (CDP) 37,115
 Peachtree City pop. 34,364
 Gainesville pop. 33,804
 East Point pop. 33,712
 Tucker (incorporated 2016) pop. 33,380
 Newnan pop. 33,039
 Redan (CDP) pop. 33,015
 Milton pop. 32,661
 Douglasville pop. 30,961
 Kennesaw pop. 29,783
 Chamblee pop. 29,231
 Lawrenceville pop. 28,546
Carrollton pop. 26,738
 Duluth pop. 26,660
 Stockbridge pop. 25,636

Places with 24,999 or fewer inhabitants

 Woodstock pop. 23,896
 Griffin pop. 23,643
 Candler-McAfee (CDP) pop. 23,025
 Canton pop. 22,958
 McDonough pop. 22,084
 Acworth pop. 20,425
 Cartersville pop. 19,731
 Union City pop. 19,456
 Decatur pop. 19,335
 North Druid Hills (CDP) pop. 18,947
 Sugar Hill pop. 18,522
 Forest Park pop. 18,468
 Snellville pop. 18,242
 North Decatur (CDP) pop. 16,698
 Fayetteville pop. 15,945
 Lithia Springs (CDP) pop. 15,491
 Suwanee pop. 15,355
 Conyers pop. 15,195
 Belvedere Park (CDP) pop. 15,152
 Riverdale pop. 15,134
 Druid Hills (CDP) pop. 14,568
 Winder pop. 14,099
 Villa Rica pop. 13,956
 College Park pop. 13,942
 Powder Springs pop. 13,940
 Monroe pop. 13,478
 Covington pop. 13,118
 Fairburn pop. 12,950
 Buford pop. 12,225
 Lilburn pop. 11,596
 Mountain Park (Gwinnett) (CDP) pop. 11,554
 Dallas pop. 11,544
 Loganville pop. 10,458
 Panthersville (CDP) pop. 9,749
 Vinings (CDP) pop. 9,734
 Tyrone pop. 9,534
 Thomaston pop. 9,170
 Norcross pop. 9,116
 Doraville pop. 8,330
 Clarkston pop. 7,554
 Braselton pop. 7,511
 Irondale (CDP) pop. 7,446
 Centerville (CDP) pop. 7,148
 Hampton pop. 6,987
 Auburn (CDP) pop. 6,887
 Barnesville pop. 6,775
 Austell pop. 6,581
 Morrow pop. 6,445
 Lovejoy pop. 6,422
 Hapeville pop. 6,373
 Conley (CDP) pop. 6,228
 Stone Mountain pop. 5,802
 Flowery Branch pop. 5,679
 Cumming pop. 5,430
 Locust Grove pop. 5,402
 Jonesboro pop. 4,724
 Palmetto pop. 4,448
 Dacula pop. 4,442
 Bonanza (CDP) pop. 3,135
 Avondale Estates pop. 2,960
 Lakeview Estates (CDP) pop. 2,695
 Grayson pop. 2,666
 Lake City pop. 2,612
 Chattahoochee Hills pop. 2,378
 Lithonia pop. 1,924
 Berkeley Lake pop. 1,574

Geography

Topography and geology
The area sprawls across the low foothills of the Appalachian Mountains to the north and the Piedmont to the south. The northern and some western suburbs tend to be higher and significantly more hilly than the southern and eastern suburbs.

Others include Blackjack Mountain, Lost Mountain, Brushy Mountain, Pine Mountain, and Mount Wilkinson (Vinings Mountain). Many of these play prominently in the various battles of the Atlanta Campaign during the American Civil War. If the further-north counties are included, Bear Mountain is highest, followed by Pine Log Mountain, Sawnee Mountain, and Hanging Mountain, followed by the others listed above. Stone, Sweat, Bear, and Sawnee are all home to some of the area's broadcast stations.

The area's subsoil is a dense clay soil, colored rusty by the iron oxide present in it. It becomes very muddy and sticky when wet, and hard when dry, and stains light-colored carpets and clothing easily. It also tends to have a low pH, further aggravating gardeners. The fineness of it also means it is easily deposited into streams during heavy rains, creating silt problems where it is exposed due to construction. This transported red soil can be seen downstream on the riverbanks of south Georgia (where the native clay is white), and down to the Florida panhandle (where the native sand is also white). Topsoil is present only in natural forest areas, created by the decomposition of leaf litter.

Earthquakes and fault lines
An extinct fault line called the Brevard Fault runs roughly parallel to the Chattahoochee River, but as its last movements were apparently prehistoric, it is considered extinct and not a threat to the region. Still, minor earthquakes do rattle the area (and all of Georgia) occasionally. One notable one was in April 2003 (magnitude 4.6) coming from the northwest, its epicenter just across the state line in northeastern Alabama. While many people slept through the 5A.M. quake, it caused a minor panic in others completely unaware of what was happening. Similar earthquakes occur in this region called the Eastern Tennessee Seismic Zone, often felt much more widely across the stronger crust of eastern North America as compared to the west. 

Thus, the 1886 Charleston, South Carolina earthquake was also felt in Atlanta and throughout the Southeast. It caused damage as far as central Alabama and West Virginia. Two small earthquakes were also felt on the southeast side near Eatonton in early April 2009. The New Madrid Seismic Zone (near the Missouri-Tennessee borders) and the seismic zone producing the 1886 magnitude 7.3 earthquake are still capable of producing moderate or major earthquakes, which the entire Atlanta area will feel moderately or even strongly.

Climate

The Atlanta metro area has a humid subtropical climate with four seasons. Summer is the longest. Snow flurries are actually common during the winter months when there is an especially deep trough in the jet stream. These events usually do not amount to more than a slight dusting and therefore go unrecognized in most weather summaries. 

Summers are long and consistently hot and humid. July mornings average  and afternoons average , with slight breezes, and typically a 20–40% chance of afternoon thunderstorms. During the summer afternoon thunderstorms, temperatures may suddenly drop to 70–77 degrees with locally heavy rainfall. Late winter and early spring, as well as July, are the wettest. Fall, especially October, is the driest.

This was broken on the last day of June 2012, when the temperature reached , during a massive heat wave that hit most of the country, with another 105 the next day tying the July record.

Hurricane Opal brought sustained tropical storm conditions to the area one night in early October 1995, uprooting hundreds of trees and causing widespread power outages, after soaking the area with rain for two days prior. Since 1950, some metro counties have been hit more than 20 times by tornadoes. Cobb (26) and Fulton (22) are two of the highest in the state. The Dunwoody tornado in early April 1998 was the worst tornado to have struck the area. A tornado struck downtown Atlanta in March 2008, causing a half-billion dollars in damage, one of the most expensive storms ever recorded anywhere.

The area experiences a winter storm with significant snowfall about once each year. This can be extremely irregular, with several consecutive years receiving no measurable snow. A blizzard (see: 1993 Storm of the Century) caught much of the Southeast off-guard in 1993, dumping  at the Atlanta airport on March 13, and much more than that in the suburbs to the north and west, as well as in the mountains. The only other recorded winter storm of comparable severity was the Great Blizzard of 1899. The heaviest snow was in January 1940, when  buried the city during its coldest month on record. The second-heaviest was in 1983, when a very late storm dumped  on March 24. Ice storms have occurred in the area. The well-remembered 1973 ice storm was brutal, as was the storm in 1982.

The Southeastern U.S. drought of 2006–2008 began with dry weather in 2006, and left area lakes very low. The USGS calculated it to be a greater-than-500-year flood.

Environment
The area's prolific rains are drained by many different streams and creeks. The main basin is that of the Chattahoochee River, running northeast to southwest. The further northwestern suburbs drain into the Etowah River via the Little River and Lake Allatoona. The southern suburbs are drained by the Flint River, and the east-southeastern ones by the Oconee River and Yellow River.

This usage was reduced by more than 10% during the drought, but soared back up after watering restrictions were eased (and before the flooding ensued). The need for water is seen as a barrier to further growth in the area, but permanent measures for non-emergency water conservation have never been put in place. The state legislature has refused to pass a requirement for low-flow toilets to be installed in homes that are sold, bowing to pressure from the real estate sales industry.

Disputes over water are becoming increasingly common, with both Alabama and Florida filing lawsuits and threatening injunctions to prevent Georgia from taking too much water, mostly for metro Atlanta. South Carolina also threatened when a pipeline east to the Savannah River was mentioned even informally. The state has now been ordered by a judge to reduce withdrawals from the Chattahoochee south of Lanier to 1970s levels within three years (2012), something that would create an immediate emergency water shortage if it were actually enforced.

Flora
The native forest canopy is mainly oak, redbud, hickory, poplar, tuliptree, pine, and sweetgum, with chestnut having been common decades before in what is now considered oak-hickory forest. Saw palmetto, Sabal palmetto and Trachycarpus fortunei have become common ornamentals as well. Traveling from the south, the metro area is generally the first area in which autumn leaf color can be seen, due to the different trees growing at the higher elevation and latitude. Underneath, the flowering dogwood is very common, the black cherry are quite prolific, with mulberry popping up sometimes as well. Sourwood is also in its native range, and is easily identified by the fact that it turns fiery red in early October, much brighter and weeks earlier than most other trees (which usually peak in early November).

Shrubby plants include blackberry, horsechestnut, sumac, and sometimes hawthorn. Virginia creeper, poison ivy, and briar are common vines. The Confederate yellow daisy is a wildflower native only to the area around Stone Mountain.

Common garden plants include dogwood, azalea, hydrangea, flowering cherry, maples, pin oak, red-tip photinia, holly, juniper, white pine, magnolia, Bradford pear, forsythia, liriope (mondograss), and English ivy. Lawns can be either cool-season grasses like fescue and rye, or warm-season like zoysia and bermudagrass which turn brown in late fall. A few homeowners associations actually prohibit green grass in the winter.

Native to the nearby mountains, maples are now one of the most common landscape trees for new homes and parking lots, giving their color in the fall instead of spring. When planted close to buildings (which provide shelter and radiate heat), they can retain some of their color into December, especially if November has been warm.

Common lawn weeds are mock strawberry, violet, wild onion, and of course the ubiquitous dandelion, crabgrass, and plantain.

By far the most notorious introduced species is kudzu, a highly invasive species from Japan which climbs and smothers trees and shrubs. New effective herbicides as well as increased development of formerly rural areas has greatly reduced kudzu in the metro area (although still quite common elsewhere in Georgia). Wisteria planted decades ago by farmers in then-rural areas has become wild and is common in undeveloped forests. Some vines exceed 50 years of age and cover dozens of acres of forest, creating a dense, purple explosion each spring.

Japanese honeysuckle is extremely common, its fragrance an early summer delight. A common ornamental shrub, the Chinese privet, has escaped to become the state's most invasive non-native plant species.

Fauna
Among mammals, the eastern gray squirrel is by far the most ubiquitous, stealing birdseed from the bird feeders which many locals maintain. Chipmunks and small brown rabbits are common, but it is relatively rare to hear of them doing any damage. Opossum, raccoons, foxes, coyotes and armadillos are frequently seen. Garden and meadow snakes are common; six venomous pit viper snakes (Eastern diamondback rattlesnake, timber rattlesnake, pygmy rattlesnake, coral snake, water moccasin and copperhead) are indigenous, but reports of bites are rare. Many types of frogs, including tree frogs and bullfrogs, are easily heard in early summer, as are cicadas in July and August. Black bears occasionally wander down from the mountains, and white-tailed deer are abundant; overpopulated in some areas. Homeowners in the outer suburbs are prone to landscaping damage due to scavenging deer.

The most common birds are the brown thrasher (the GA state bird), American crow, European (or common) starling, American robin, mourning dove, house sparrow, northern cardinal, house finch, Carolina chickadee, tufted titmouse, bluejay, white-breasted nuthatch, eastern bluebird, mockingbird, brown-headed nuthatch, and Carolina wren. Birds of prey thrive in the area, with three varieties of hawks common near open fields in even the most populated areas. Falcons roost on skyscrapers in downtown Atlanta and can be regularly seen feasting on pigeons. 

The American kestrel is sometimes seen. Late in the year, three species of owls can be heard nightly in wooded areas. Various woodpeckers can be seen in forested lots, including the red-bellied woodpecker, northern flicker (also known as the "yellow-shafted flicker"), and the downy woodpecker. The red-headed woodpecker is common in open fields and on golf courses. The American goldfinch is present mostly in winter, and the ruby-throated hummingbird only in summer.

Government and politics

In geographic terms, Georgia has the smallest average county size of any state. This focuses government more locally but allows greater conflict between multiple jurisdictions, each with its own agenda.

The first significant intergovernmental agency in metro Atlanta was the Metropolitan Atlanta Rapid Transit Authority, which runs the MARTA public transportation system. Alongside other factors such as race and class, as well as a lack of planning and perceived lack of need, problems associated with the inner city of Atlanta (crime, poverty, and poor public school performance) influenced Cobb, Gwinnett, and Clayton county voters to refuse to allow construction of MARTA into their respective counties during the 1970s. These decisions resulted in permanent effects on land development in the region, making use of private automobiles even more of a necessity.

The Atlanta Regional Commission is so far the closest that the area has come to a metropolitan government. It approves only those projects deemed to have a positive effect beyond the immediate area in which they are to be constructed. The Georgia Regional Transportation Authority is somewhat of a cross between ARC and MARTA, working to improve mobility, air quality, and land use practices in the region. GRTA also operates Xpress buses from 11 counties, and could operate commuter rail service in the future. Currently, plans for commuter rail and eventual intercity rail (including the long-proposed but still unfunded Atlanta Multimodal Passenger Terminal) are the responsibility of the Georgia Rail Passenger Authority, which receives almost no funding.

Since 2007 proposals have been floated to allow new multi-county sales taxes, in addition to existing county sales taxes for roads, to pay for regional transportation initiatives.

Demographics

The 2020 census counted 6,089,815 people in the 28-county metro area. This was an increase of 803,087 versus the same 28-county area in 2010. The population increased by 15.2% between 2010 and 2020, less than the 28.6% increase between 2000 and 2010.

 Atlanta MSA in 2000 did not include Butts, Dawson, Haralson, Heard, Jasper, Lamar, Meriwether, and Pike counties, whose population totalled in 2000: 135,783; in 2010: 156,368 (2.96% of total new 28-county metro) Compares the larger 28-county Atlanta-Sandy Springs-Marietta MSA 2010 with a smaller 20‑county Atlanta MSA 2000; however the 8 new counties represent less than 3% of the larger 28‑county metro.Source: for race and Hispanic population, U.S. Census Bureau 2010 and 2000 census; for foreign-born population: US Census Bureau 2010 and 2000 American Community Surveys; Immigrants in 2010 Metropolitan America, Brookings Institution

Race and ethnicity
White Americans made up 55.4% of metro Atlanta's population in 2010, a relative decrease from 63.0% ten years earlier, but in absolute numbers their population increased by over 330,000. Non-Hispanic whites proportionally dropped from 59.5% to 50.7% of the metro's population, while increasing by about 224,000.

Black Americans are the largest racial minority with 32.4% of the population in 2010, up from 28.9% in 2000. The city of Atlanta has long been regarded as a "black mecca" for its role as a center of black education, political power, wealth, and culture. From 2000 to 2010, the geographic distribution of blacks in Metro Atlanta changed radically. Long concentrated in the city of Atlanta and DeKalb County, the black population there dropped as more than half a million African Americans settled across other parts of the metro area, including approximately 112,000 in Gwinnett County, 71,000 in Fulton outside Atlanta, 58,000 in Cobb, 50,000 in Clayton, 34,000 in Douglas, and 27,000 each in Newton and Rockdale counties. 

Due to its availability of jobs, Atlanta has been a destination for young college-educated blacks in the Reverse Great Migration of African Americans from the North since the turn of the 21st century, with many settling quickly into suburban locations. The Atlanta metropolitan area has the second highest total African American population of any metropolitan area, with only the New York City metro area having more.

Hispanic Americans are the fastest growing ethnic group. At 10.4% of the metro's population in 2010, versus only 6.5% in 2000, the metro's Hispanic population increased an astounding 109.6%, or 298,459 people, in ten years. Major Hispanic groups include 354,351 Mexicans, 43,337 Puerto Ricans and 17,648 Cubans. All of those groups' populations increased by over 90% in the ten-year period. Of the metro's 299,000-person increase in the Hispanic population from 2000 to 2010, 98,000 were in Gwinnett County, 57,000 in Cobb, 55,000 in Fulton (all but 3,000 outside the city of Atlanta), 20,000 in Hall, and 15,000 in DeKalb County.

The Asian-American population also increased rapidly from 2000 to 2010. There were 296,956 Asian-Americans in the metro area in 2010, making up 5.9% of the population. This represented an 87% increase over 2000. The largest Asian groups are 108,980 Indian-Americans, 93,870 Korean-Americans, 67,660 Chinese-Americans, and 66,554 Vietnamese-Americans.

Atlanta also has Georgia's largest Bosnian-American population, with approximately 10,000 in the metro area, mainly in Gwinnett County.

Metro Atlanta has an increasingly international population, with 716,434 foreign-born residents in 2010, a 69% increase since 2000, with suburban Gwinnnett County being one of the most diverse counties in the Southeastern United States. This was the fourth largest rate of growth among the nation's top 100 metros, after Baltimore, Orlando and Las Vegas. The foreign-born proportion of the population went up from 10.3% to 13.6%, and Atlanta moved up from 14th to 12th in ranking of U.S. metro areas with the largest immigrant population by sheer numbers. Still, its 13.6% proportion of immigrants is only the 29th highest of the nation's top 100 metros.

Metro Atlanta's immigrants are more suburban than those of most cities. Out of the top 100 U.S. metros, Atlanta has the 11th highest ratio of the foreign-born living in the suburbs and not in the core city. Atlanta has a few ethnic enclaves such as a Koreatown, and areas such as the Buford Highway Corridor in DeKalb County and parts of Gwinnett County are commercial centers for multiple ethnic communities.

In 1990, greater Atlanta had the largest Japanese population in the Southeast United States. The Consulate General of Japan in Atlanta estimated that, during that year, 7,500 to 10,000 Japanese lived in greater Atlanta. Of the metropolitan areas in the Southeast United States, as of 1990 greater Atlanta had the most extensive education network for Japanese nationals.

Language
In 2008, approximately 83.3% of the population five years and older spoke only English at home, which is roughly 4,125,000 people. Over 436,000 people (8.8%) spoke Spanish at home, giving Metro Atlanta the 15th highest number of Spanish speakers among American metropolitan areas (MSAs). Over 193,000 people (3.9%) spoke other Indo-European languages at home. People who speak an Asian language at home numbered over 137,000 and made up 2.8% of the population.

Economy

The Atlanta area is home to 31 Fortune 1000 headquarters. 2022 rankings:

The Federal Reserve Bank of Atlanta is the sixth district of the 12 Federal Reserve Banks of the United States and is headquartered in midtown Atlanta. The Atlanta Fed covers the U.S. states of Alabama, Florida, and Georgia, the eastern two-thirds of Tennessee, the southern portion of Louisiana, and southern Mississippi as part of the Federal Reserve System.

Utilities
The area is the world's largest toll-free calling zone spanning , has four active telephone area codes, and local calling extending into portions of two others. 404, which originally covered all of northern Georgia until 1992, now covers mostly the area inside the Perimeter (Interstate 285). In 1995 the suburbs were put into 770, requiring mandatory ten‑digit dialing even for local calls under FCC rules. This made Atlanta one of the US's first cities to employ ten-digit dialing, which was begun by BellSouth the year before the Centennial 1996 Olympic Games. 

In 1998, 678 was overlaid onto both of the existing 404 and 770 area codes. Mobile phones, originally only assigned to 404, may now have any local area code regardless of where in the region they were issued. Area code 470, the newest area code, was overlaid with 404 and 770 in the same fashion as 678. The local calling area also includes portions of 706/762 and a small area of 256 in Alabama on the Georgia border.

The city of Atlanta is the most wired city in the United States. Many residents access the internet on a high-speed broadband and/or WiFi connection. It is home to one of the world's largest fiber-optic bundles.

Major petroleum and natural gas pipelines cross the area, running from the Gulf coast, Texas, and Louisiana to the population centers of the Northeastern U.S. This includes Colonial Pipeline and Plantation Pipeline, both based in Alpharetta.

Metro Atlanta primarily uses natural gas for central heating and water heaters, with the major exception of heat pumps in apartments built during and since the 1980s. This is because winters are mild, and large apartment buildings usually require little energy to heat. Backup heat (also used during defrosting) is usually supplied by electric resistance heating, though some homes have hybrid heating units which use gas backup when it is cold. Exurban homes may also use all-electric instead of gas, if gas mains have not been extended to an area.

Cooktops and ovens are a mix of gas and electric, while gas clothes dryers are rather rare.  with a manual-valve gas starter, and some are now equipped with permanent gas logs with electric switch start. Some homes also have natural gas barbecue grills, formerly sold at utility company stores.

Georgia Power is the main electric power company across the state and the metro area, beginning in 1902 as Georgia Railway and Power Company, Atlanta's streetcar (trolley) company. Several electric membership corporations also serve the suburbs. These include the second-largest EMC in the nation in Jackson EMC, Cobb EMC, Walton EMC, and Sawnee EMC. The city of Marietta operates its own electric utility, Marietta Power, under the Board of Lights & Water (BLW). It is also a member of the Municipal Electric Association of Georgia (MEAG).

Atlanta Gas Light is the natural gas utility for the region, and has been so for over a century and a half, since it installed gas lamps in Atlanta in 1856. It operated as a regulated monopoly until November 1998, the after the state legislature voted in early 1997 to deregulate natural gas marketing, and make customers choose among nearly 20 different marketers still selling the same AGL-wholesaled gas, such as Gas South, Infinite Energy, SCANA and Georgia Natural Gas. Most of the gas comes via pipeline from Louisiana.

Water is provided by various county and a few city systems. Several of these systems actually serve parts of neighboring counties and cities as well. The Cobb-Marietta Water Authority serves not only Cobb, but also parts of neighboring Paulding and Cherokee counties, for example. During drought or other emergency, cities and counties can enact outdoor water-use restrictions, however some cross-jurisdiction water systems have also acted to put bans in place. In late September 2007, the state Environmental Protection Division of the Georgia Department of Natural Resources, stepped-in with its first-ever ban, covering most of the northern half of the state.

Sewerage is also handled by the water utilities, but the various water and sewer networks may not conform to the same boundaries, resulting in interbasin water transfers. This is for practical reasons, because the area is hilly and divided by several watersheds, because the area has developed irregularly and erratically, and because water treatment plants are usually not near sewage treatment plants. Septic tanks are still used in the older homes of some exurbs.

Housing
Low-density residential subdivision development dominates the metro Atlanta suburbs.

Changes in house prices for the metro area are publicly tracked on a regular basis using the Case–Shiller index; the statistic is published by Standard & Poor's and is also a component of S&P's 20‑city composite index of the value of the U.S. residential real estate market.

Community improvement districts 
All of Georgia's community improvement districts are located in metro Atlanta.
 Buckhead Community Improvement District, covering Buckhead
 Perimeter Center Community Improvement Districts, covering the Perimeter Center area of Sandy Springs and Dunwoody/
 Cumberland Community Improvement District, around Cumberland Mall
 Town Center Area Community Improvement District, around Town Center at Cobb mall
 Gwinnett Place Community Improvement District, around Gwinnett Place Mall
Gateway85 Community Improvement District, covering area southeast of Norcross
 Evermore Community Improvement District, or Highway 78 Community Improvement District, covering part of the U.S. 78 corridor in Gwinnett near Snellville
 Lilburn Community Improvement District, established early 2010 in Lilburn
Aerotropolis Atlanta CIDs
Boulevard CID (industrial district), created 2010

In May 2016, the City of Atlanta launched Atlanta City Studio, the city's first "pop-up urban design laboratory focused on shaping the future of city neighborhoods." The studio hosts "lectures, open forums, urban art presentations and other neighborhood and design components."
Atlanta City Studio will relocate twice per year in order for residents to interact with staff and share their ideas about improving city design. The studio is located on the second floor of Ponce City Market and in January 2017 will relocate "to a retail location on the Westside, possibly on MLK Jr. Drive or Cascade Road."

Education

Colleges and universities

 Agnes Scott College – Decatur
 Atlanta Metropolitan State College – Atlanta
 Atlanta Technical College – Atlanta
 Atlanta University Center – Atlanta
 Clark Atlanta University
 Morehouse College
 Morehouse School of Medicine
 Spelman College
 Brenau University – Gainesville
 Chattahoochee Technical College – Acworth and Marietta
 Clayton State University – Morrow
 Columbia Theological Seminary – Decatur
 Emory University – Atlanta
 Georgia College – Milledgeville
 Georgia Gwinnett College – Lawrenceville
 Georgia Institute of Technology – Atlanta
 Georgia Piedmont Technical College – Clarkston
 Georgia State University – Atlanta
 Perimeter College – Alpharetta, Clarkston, Covington, Decatur and Dunwoody
 Gwinnett Technical College – Lawrenceville
 Interdenominational Theological Center – Atlanta
 John Marshall Law School – Atlanta
 Kennesaw State University – Kennesaw and Marietta
 Lanier Technical College – Gainesville, Cumming, Winder, Dawsonville and Commerce
 Life University – Marietta
 Mercer University – Atlanta
 Morris Brown College – Atlanta
 Oglethorpe University – Brookhaven
 Oxford College – Oxford
 Reinhardt University – Waleska
 Savannah College of Art and Design – Atlanta
 Southern Crescent Technical College – Griffin
 University of North Georgia – Gainesville
 University of West Georgia – Carrollton and Newnan
 West Georgia Technical College – Carrollton, Douglasville, Newnan and Waco

School districts

 Atlanta Public Schools
Barrow County Schools
Bartow County School District
 Buford City School District
Butts County School District
Carroll County School District
Carrollton City School District 
Cartersville City School District
Cherokee County School District
Clayton County Public Schools
Cobb County Public Schools
Coweta County School System
Dawson County School District
Decatur City School District
DeKalb County School System
Douglas County School District
Fayette County School System
Forsyth County Schools

 Fulton County Public Schools
Gainesville City School District
Griffin-Spalding County School District
 Gwinnett County Public Schools
Hall County School District
Haralson County School District
Heard County School District
Henry County School District
Jasper County School District
Lamar County School District
Marietta City School District
Meriwether County School District
Morgan County School District
Newton County School District
Paulding County School District
Pickens County School District
Pike County School District
Rockdale County School District
Social Circle City School District
Walton County School District

Healthcare
The area is served by a network of healthcare facilities including private practice, urgent care, hospital systems, and specialty care facilities. There are approximately 37 hospitals serving the metro. There are both private for profit systems and community not-for-profit systems.

Hospitals with # beds

Trauma Centers - Level I * ; Level II **

Children's Healthcare of Atlanta
Egleston Hospital - Atlanta - 235
Hughes Spalding Hospital - Atlanta - 82
Scottish Rite Hospital - Sandy Springs - 319

Emory Healthcare
Emory University Hospital - Atlanta - 733
Emory University Hospital-Midtown - Atlanta - 511
Emory University Hospital-Wesley Woods - Atlanta - 71
Emory University Orthopedic and Spine Hospital - Tucker - 75
Emory Decatur Hospital - Decatur - 422
Emory Hillandale Hospital - Lithonia - 90
Emory Johns Creek Hospital - Johns Creek - 118
Emory Saint Joseph's Hospital - Sandy Springs - 356

Grady Memorial Hospital - Atlanta - 974 *

Northeast Georgia Medical Center - Gainesville - 872 **

Northside Hospital
Northside Hospital Atlanta - Sandy Springs - 621
Northside Hospital Cherokee - Canton - 126
Northside Hospital Duluth - Duluth - 81
Northside Hospital Forsyth - Cumming - 304
Northside Hospital Gwinnett - Lawrenceville - 353 **

Piedmont Hospital
Piedmont Atlanta Hospital - Atlanta - 512
Piedmont Eastside Hospital - Snellville - 287
Piedmont Fayette Hospital - Fayetteville - 290
Piedmont Henry Hospital - Stockbridge - 341
Piedmont Mountainside Hospital - Jasper - 52
Piedmont Newnan Hospital - Newnan - 154
Piedmont Newton Hospital - Covington - 94
Piedmont Rockdale Hospital - Conyers - 138
Piedmont Walton Hospital - Monroe - 77

Shepherd Center - Atlanta - 152

Wellstar Health System
Wellstar Atlanta Medical Center - Atlanta - 528 *
Wellstar Atlanta Medical Center-South - East Point - 198
Wellstar Cobb Hospital - Austell - 387
Wellstar Douglas Hospital - Douglasville - 102
Wellstar Kennestone Hospital - Marietta - 662 **
Wellstar North Fulton Hospital - Roswell - 202 **
Wellstar Paulding Hospital - Hiram - 294
Wellstar Spalding Regional Hospital - Griffin - 160

Veterans Administration Health Care
Veterans Administration Medical Center - Decatur

Media

Radio
 Q99.7, 99.7 Atlanta's Hit Music
 Star 94, 94.1
 The River, 97.1
 V-103, 103.3 – Contemporary and Classic R&B and Hip-Hop
 El Patron 105.3 – Atlanta's #1 Hit Regional Mexican Station
 Radio 105.7
 Power 96.1 – Atlanta's New Hit Music Station
 praise 102.5
 Bull 94.9
 Rock 100.5
 hot 107.9 – Atlantas #1 hip hop station
 104.7 The Fish
 WSB Radio 95.5FM and 750AM
 WREK 91.1 - Georgia Tech's Student Radio

TV
 CNN
 Turner Broadcasting
 The Weather Channel
 Georgia Public Broadcasting (PBS), 9 stations
 Adult Swim

Print
 Atlanta Business Chronicle
 The Atlanta Journal-Constitution
 Atlanta Magazine
 Atlanta Parent
 The Atlantan
 Gwinnett Daily Post
 Jezebel
 Marietta Daily Journal

Culture and attractions

Professional sports teams

Former teams include the Atlanta Flames (now Calgary Flames) and Atlanta Thrashers (now Winnipeg Jets), both of the National Hockey League.

Atlanta also plays host to one NASCAR Cup Series race each year at Atlanta Motor Speedway.

The Atlanta metropolitan area is also home to three NCAA Division I programs, with the Georgia Tech Yellow Jackets and Georgia State Panthers in Atlanta proper and the Kennesaw State Owls in Kennesaw. Both Georgia Tech and Georgia State are members of the Football Bowl Subdivision in the Atlantic Coast Conference and Sun Belt Conference, respectively, while Kennesaw State is a member of the ASUN Conference in the Football Championship Subdivision; however, Kennesaw State accepted an invitation to move up to the FBS level from Conference USA starting in 2024.

Performing arts venues

 Atlanta Symphony Hall
 Alliance Theater
 Cobb Energy Centre
 Fox Theatre
 Infinite Energy Arena
 Sandy Springs Performing Arts Center
 Spivey Hall

Museums

 Center for Puppetry Arts
 Children's Museum of Atlanta
 Delta Flight Museum
 Fernbank Museum of Natural History
 Fernbank Science Center
 High Museum of Art
 Jimmy Carter Library and Museum

Amusement

 College Football Hall of Fame
 Georgia Aquarium
 Medieval Times Dinner & Tournament
 National Center for Civil and Human Rights
 Six Flags Over Georgia
 Six Flags White Water
 World of Coca-Cola
 Zoo Atlanta

Parks

 Atlanta Botanical Garden
 The Beltline
 Centennial Olympic Park
 Chastain Park
 Chattahoochee River National Recreation Area
 Clayton County International Park/The Beach
 Freedom Park
 Grant Park
 Historic Fourth Ward Park
 Kennesaw Mountain National Battlefield Park
 Piedmont Park
 Stone Mountain
 Woodruff Park

Festivals

Music Midtown

Other

 CNN Center

Military presence
 Dobbins Air Reserve Base
 Fort Gillem, closed
 Fort McPherson, closed

Transportation
The U.S. Census Bureau has defined a metropolitan area for Atlanta which includes, but is not limited to, Roswell, Georgia and Sandy Springs, Georgia. According to the 2016 American Community Survey, about 78% of working metropolitan residents commuted by driving alone, 9% carpooled, 3% used public transportation, and 1% walked. Less than 1% of working residents commuted by bicycle, while about 2% of commuters travelled by all other means. About 7% of residents worked at home.

Transit systems
Atlanta has always been a rail town, and the city once had an extensive streetcar system, which also provided interurban service as far out as Marietta,  to the northwest. The streetcars were replaced by an extensive trolleybus system, supplemented by buses, in the 1940s and 1950–52, and then converted to all buses in the 1950s and 1960–62. However, building a modern rapid transit system proved a difficult and drawn-out process and, compared to the original plans for a regional system, has only partially been accomplished.

MARTA operates buses and a subway system in the city of Atlanta, Fulton, Clayton and Dekalb counties, while Cobb and Gwinnett counties operate their own independent Suburban Transit Systems that feed into MARTA. This is a result of those counties' refusal to join the MARTA system (although Gwinnett voted in March 2019 to join MARTA again), a situation which was originally closely related to white flight from the city. It is the only US system in which the state does not provide any funds for operation or expansion, instead relying entirely on a 1% sales tax in its three counties. Due to the passage of a 1% sales tax in Clayton County on November 4, 2014, MARTA replaced the defunct C-Tran system bringing buses and commuter rail to the county beginning March 2015, with full bus service in 2016. The Atlanta Streetcar, a  light rail loop, connects Centennial Olympic Park and MARTA heavy rail subway to the Sweet Auburn district and points in between. Xpress GA, a suburban commuter bus service operated by the Georgia Regional Transportation Authority or GRTA, has over 32 routes running from the suburbs and exurbs to downtown Atlanta in 12 metropolitan counties.

Plans are underway for commuter rail and bus rapid transit (BRT), though these are some years away. The $20 billion Northwest Corridor HOV/BRT project appears to conflict with other plans, such as the metro-wide Concept 3 approved by the Transit Planning Board, and the no-barrier HOT lanes on I‑85 in Gwinnett. MARTA is also considering a BRT line of its own to the east.

The first commuter rail line would run south of the city, eventually extended to Lovejoy and possibly Hampton near Atlanta Motor Speedway. The "Brain Train" would likely be the second route, connecting the University of Georgia in Athens to Emory University and Georgia Tech in Atlanta.

As planned, all commuter trains would arrive at the Atlanta Multimodal Passenger Terminal (MMPT), the long-delayed facility just across Peachtree Street from the Five Points MARTA station, where all of its lines meet. Planning for the system and its extension as intercity rail across the state are the responsibility of the Georgia Rail Passenger Authority.

Another proposed plan that has received very strong grassroots support in recent years is the BeltLine, a greenbelt and transit system that takes advantage of existing and unused rail tracks to set up a  light rail or streetcar circuit around the core of Atlanta, as well as establishing more green space and footpaths for pedestrians and bicyclists.

Commercial railways
Before Atlanta was even a city, it was a railroad hub. From this came the joke, popular among other Southerners, that "regardless of whether one goes to heaven or hell, everyone must go through Atlanta first". Many of its suburbs pre-date it as depots or train stations along the major lines in and out of town.

Many of these historic stations, including Atlanta's Union Station and Terminal Station, were demolished like many county courthouses and other historic buildings. Many have been saved however, including the L&N station in Woodstock, and the stations along the main W&A line in Marietta and Smyrna.

Through mergers, the main railroads in the area are now Norfolk Southern and CSX. The Georgia Northeastern Railroad is a short line that also services part of the area. There are also several railyards of Atlanta and vicinity, as well as the Southeastern Railway Museum and the Southern Museum of Civil War and Locomotive History.

The National Railroad Passenger Corporation, more commonly known as Amtrak, runs the intercity rail line Crescent through metro Atlanta twice daily, with one train heading towards New Orleans and the other headed towards New York. All trains make a scheduled stop at Peachtree Station in northern Midtown Atlanta, but it is also possible for arrange for trains to stop in Gainesville, Georgia as well.

Air
Hartsfield-Jackson Atlanta International Airport is the world's busiest airport and is the only international airport for the region (and only major international airport for the state), and as with rail travel, it became the ubiquitous place through which everyone must travel at some point. Atlanta's second airport is in the very preliminary discussion and study phase.

Domestic-only carriers from Atlanta:
 Alaska Airlines
 American Airlines
 Frontier Airlines
 JetBlue Airways
 Spirit Airlines
 United Airlines

Domestic and international from Atlanta:
 Delta Air Lines
 Southwest Airlines

Foreign-based international carriers:
 Aeromexico
 Air Canada
 Air France (Joint venture with Delta Air Lines)
 British Airways
 KLM Royal Dutch Airlines (Joint venture with Delta Air Lines)
 Korean Air
 Lufthansa German Airlines
 Qatar Airways
 Turkish Airlines
 Virgin Atlantic
 WestJet

Other airports (maintained by local counties) include Charlie Brown Field (Fulton), McCollum Field (Cobb), Cartersville Airport (Bartow), DeKalb Peachtree Airport (DeKalb), Briscoe Field (Gwinnett), Coweta County Airport (Coweta), Cherokee County Airport (Cherokee), Atlanta Speedway Airport (Henry), and Paulding County Airport (Paulding). Former local airports were Stone Mountain Airport and Parkaire Field, among others.

DeKalb Peachtree Airport is the primary business jet airport. This is due to its proximity to Downtown, Midtown, Buckhead, and the Perimeter office areas.

Roads and freeways

Atlanta is served by three major interstate highways. Including tributaries, they are the following:

(Note: The cities used below are also the control cities used for the Metro Atlanta Bypass/I-285 signs entering from the suburbs.)

Interstate 75 passes through from Macon to the south, and from Chattanooga to the north. Interstate 575 is a spur which merges with I‑75 near Kennesaw. I‑575 serves northeast portions of Cobb County and a large portion of Cherokee County. It ends in Ball Ground. Interstate 675 is a route which connects I‑75 in Henry County to I‑285 in southern Dekalb County. Most of the corridor is within Clayton County.

Interstate 85 passes through from Montgomery on the southwest and from Greenville on the northeast. I-75 merges with I-85 to form the Downtown Connector from the Brookwood Interchange, just north of Midtown Atlanta, to just south of the Lakewood Freeway in south Atlanta. Interstate 185 is a spur which merges with I‑85 in LaGrange and stretches southward to Columbus. Interstate 985 is a spur which merges with I‑85 in Suwanee and serves the northern suburbs of Gwinnett and Hall Counties. It terminates just northeast of Gainesville.

Interstate 285 is the beltway which encircles the city and its immediate eastern suburbs. It is commonly known as the Perimeter. I‑285 passes through Clayton, Cobb, Fulton, and DeKalb Counties.

Interstate 20 passes through from Birmingham to the west and from Augusta to the east. It serves Douglasville, the major suburb west of Atlanta. It serves Lithonia and Conyers to the east.

Atlanta is also served by several other freeways, in addition to the interstate highways, including:

Georgia 400 is the main corridor serving the north-central suburbs, and was the only toll road in the metropolitan Atlanta area. As of November 23, 2013, the tolls ended and the toll plazas were demolished. It reaches into the northern portion of Fulton County and gradually turns northeast before entering Forsyth County. The controlled-access portion terminates just northeast of the city of Cumming. To the south, it terminates and merges into southbound I‑85 just south of the Buckhead business district. Cumming/Dahlonega is used on I‑285 as the northbound sign, and Atlanta/Buckhead as the southbound. From I‑85 northbound, it uses Buckhead/Cumming.

Stone Mountain Freeway, or U.S. 78, is an 8‑mile corridor east of Downtown Atlanta and the neighboring suburb of Decatur. It serves northeast portions of Dekalb County, including the city of Stone Mountain. It continues east as a divided highway into south Gwinnett County, including the suburb of Snellville. U.S. 78 also stretches east to Athens.

Lakewood Freeway, or Georgia 166, extends between Lakewood Park in south Atlanta and Campbellton Road, just west of I‑285.

Peachtree Industrial Blvd, or Georgia 141, is a route north-northeast of Atlanta which begins on the north side of I‑285 and runs parallel to I‑85 for about four miles until it terminates when it splits into GA‑141 and Peachtree Industrial (continuing as a normal divided highway).

Georgia State Route 316 is a four-mile-long route that branches from I‑85 and stretches eastward into Gwinnett County. It continues east as a normal divided highway through the suburb of Lawrenceville and on to Athens.

There are many historic roads across the area, named after its mills and early ferries, and the bridges later built to replace the ferries. Pace's Ferry is perhaps the best known.

Owing to the area's long history of settlement and uneven terrain, most arterial roads are not straight but meander instead, which can be confusing as much as the famed proliferation of Atlanta streets with "Peachtree" in the name. It is also often joked that half the streets are named Peachtree, while the other half have several names to make up for it.

Partly, confusion is because the region maintains the historic nomenclature of each county naming its roads for the towns they connect with in surrounding counties. Thus, from Dallas to Roswell, Georgia 120 is Marietta Highway to the Paulding/Cobb county line, is Dallas Highway to the city of Marietta, Whitlock Avenue to the town square, South Park Square for just one city block, Roswell Street to Cobb Parkway (at the Big Chicken), Roswell Road to the Cobb/Fulton county line, and finally Marietta Street to the town square in Roswell. Further confusion is from the arbitrary location of state routes by the Georgia Department of Transportation (GDOT), so that they travel an erratic path requiring several turns by drivers instead of traveling the original straight route; and the renaming of roads by state legislators to honor their friends.

There are many roads like this throughout the area, leading to duplication of names in different counties. In Fulton, "Roswell Road" refers to Georgia 9 through northern Atlanta and across Sandy Springs, in addition to the above-mentioned use in Cobb, for example. Numeric street addressing is done by county as well, with the origin usually being at one corner of the town square in the county seat. The U.S. Postal Service ignores these actual and logical boundaries however, overlapping ZIP codes and their associated place names across counties. The Cumberland/Galleria area has Cobb's numbers and an "SE" suffix, but is called "Atlanta" by the USPS (despite being Vinings, which the USPS ironically calls "unacceptable"), which can confuse visitors to think it is far away in southeast Atlanta.

Where more than one town in the same county has a road to the same place, the smaller towns have their own name prefixed to it, while the county seat does not. The road need not go directly to the other place, but may connect through other roads. Examples include Due West Road west from Marietta, Kennesaw Due West Road southwest from Kennesaw, and Acworth Due West Road south from Acworth. Some are usually hyphenated, like Peachtree-Dunwoody Road, Ashford-Dunwoody Road, Chamblee-Dunwoody Road, and Chamblee-Tucker Road.

There are also several roads named for communities which have been overwhelmed by the urban and suburban sprawl, and so are somewhat odd to newcomers. These include Sandy Plains, Crabapple, Toonigh, Luxomni, and Due West. Some of these communities are in the middle of the road, while some are at or very near one end. Some areas are renamed, either over time (Sandy Plains gradually became "Sprayberry" when Sprayberry High School moved there and similarly named shopping centers popped up around it); by the USPS (Toonigh is identified as "Lebanon"), or after rapid development. In such cases, the roads usually maintain their historic names even if the neighborhoods do not.

There are also a few U.S. highways that cross the area, including 19, 23, 29, 41, and 78.

Other arterials are completely new, like much of Barrett Parkway, Sugarloaf Parkway and South Fulton Parkway, constructed by their counties but partly covered with a state route number. Occasionally, roads are realigned or extended to meet each other directly at a cross-road, leading to odd curves and name changes.

See also 
 North Georgia

References

External links
 
 

 
Regions of Georgia (U.S. state)
Metropolitan areas of Georgia (U.S. state)